Mirny is a rural locality (a settlement) and the administrative center of Chemrovsky Selsoviet, Zonalny District, Altai Krai, Russia. The population was 1,487 as of 2013. There are 25 streets.

Geography 
Mirny is located 15 km southeast of Zonalnoye (the district's administrative centre) by road. Novaya Chemrovka is the nearest rural locality.

References 

Rural localities in Zonalny District